The House by the "Town Gates" is a historic home in Annapolis, Anne Arundel County, Maryland.  It is a large and imposing brick building, 2½ stories high and five bays wide. It was originally constructed in the second quarter of the 19th century as a single-family dwelling, later converted into commercial spaces by the latter part of that century. The alley along the west side of the building is the only undisturbed example of original cobblestone paving known in Annapolis.

It was listed on the National Register of Historic Places in 1973.

References

External links
, including photo from 2000, at Maryland Historical Trust

Houses on the National Register of Historic Places in Maryland
Houses in Annapolis, Maryland
National Register of Historic Places in Annapolis, Maryland